The Bishop of Lichfield is the ordinary of the Church of England Diocese of Lichfield in the Province of Canterbury. The diocese covers 4,516 km2 (1,744 sq. mi.) of the counties of Powys, Staffordshire, Shropshire, Warwickshire and West Midlands. The bishop's seat is located in the Cathedral Church of the Blessed Virgin Mary and Saint Chad in the city of Lichfield. The Bishop's residence is the Bishop's House, Lichfield, in the cathedral close. In the past, the title has had various forms (see below). The current bishop is Michael Ipgrave, following the confirmation of his election on 10 June 2016.

History

The diocese of Mercia was founded 656 by Diuma with its see at Repton. When Chad was made Bishop in 669, he moved his seat to Lichfield, thus the diocese was named after that city. In 691 the area over which the bishop held authority was divided to form the smaller dioceses of Lichfield, Leicester, Lindsey, Worcester and Hereford.

It was briefly the seat of an archbishop under Hygeberht from 787 to 799 (officially dissolved in 803) during the ascendancy of the kingdom of Mercia. Offa, King of Mercia seemed to resent his own bishops paying allegiance to the Archbishop of Canterbury in Kent who, whilst under Offa's control, was not of his own kingdom of Mercia. Offa therefore created his own archbishopric in Lichfield, who presided over all the bishops from the Humber to the Thames, in 786, with the consent of Pope Adrian I. The Pope's official representatives were received warmly by Offa and were present at the Council of Chelsea (787), often called 'the contentious synod', where it was proposed that the Archbishopric of Canterbury be restricted in order to make way for Offa's new archbishop. It was vehemently opposed, but Offa and the papal representatives defeated Jænberht, Archbishop of Canterbury, installing Hygeberht as the new Archbishop of Lichfield. Pope Adrian sent Hygeberht his ceremonial garment, obviously denoting his support for this move. In gratitude, Offa promised to send an annual shipment of gold to the pope for alms and supplying the lights in St. Peter's church in Rome. However the Archbishopric of Lichfield only lasted for 16 years, ending after Offa's death, when at the Fifth Council of Clovesho it was restored to Æthelhard, Archbishop of Canterbury, by Pope Leo III.

The bishop's seat was briefly moved to Chester in 1075, but by 1102 was in Coventry. From 1228 Bishop of Coventry and Lichfield became the official title with seats at both cathedrals, though various older names remained in common usage.

After the Reformation of the 1530s the cathedral at Coventry was demolished, and after the Restoration of Charles II in 1660 the bishop used the style Bishop of Lichfield and Coventry. In 1837 the ancient bishopric was divided. The archdeaconry of Coventry (comprising northern and eastern Warwickshire) was transferred to the see of Worcester and the style Bishop of Lichfield adopted.

List of bishops

Assistant bishops
Among those called Assistant Bishop of Lichfield, or coadjutor bishop, were:
1869–1880: Edmund Hobhouse, former Anglican Bishop of Nelson
1870–1878: Charles Abraham, former Bishop of Wellington
1882–1891: Charles Bromby, Rector of Montford (until 1887), then Warden of St John's Hospital, Lichfield, and former Bishop of Tasmania

Notes

References
Beresford, W. (n.d.). Diocesan Histories: Lichfield. London: SPCK
Cahill, M. (2001). The diocese of Coventry and Lichfield 1603–1642. PhD dissertation. University of Warwick.
Cooper, T. N. (1994). Oligarchy and conflict : Lichfield Cathedral clergy in the early sixteenth century in 'Midland History', 19, 40–57.

Haydn, Joseph. (1894). Haydn's Book of Dignities (1894). Horace Ockerby.
Stenton, Frank M. (1971) Anglo-Saxon England (Third Edition). Oxford University Press
Whittaker, James. (2004). Whitaker's Almanack 1883 to 2004. A & C Black, London.

 
Lichfield
 
Bishops of Lichfield
Bishop of Mercia